Telegraphs were an alternative rock band based in Brighton, England.

Biography
Formed in 2005, Telegraphs was made up of members Darcy Harrison (vocals), Hattie Williams (bass/vocals), Sam Bacon (drums), Darren LeWarne (guitar) and Aung Yay (also known as Gary Yay) (guitar/backing vocals).  They played alternative rock, emotionally charged lyrically and accompanied by cutting angular guitars, riff-based melodies and pounding, driven drum-rhythms, influenced by such bands as Biffy Clyro, Reuben, Oceansize and Idlewild.  The band split on 17 September 2010.

Album recording
In 2008 the band completed the recording of their album We Were Ghosts, recorded under Dave Eringa (Idlewild, Manic Street Preachers, These Animal Men).  The album was released in May 2009 on Small Town Records to favourable reviews, receiving 4 Ks out of five in Kerrang! magazine and 8/10 in NME. It was preceded by the single "I Don't Navigate By You" released on 2 March under the same label.

Track list
"The Argument"
"We Dance in Slow Motion"
"Your First Love Is Dead"
"Forever Never"
"Drop D Not Bombs"
"I Don't Navigate By You"
"The Rules of Modern Policing"
"So Cold"
"Notes From An Exit Station"
"Eyes Stitched Open"
"What's So Good About Goodbye?"

Discography

Singles

Albums

External links

Official Website
 

English alternative rock groups
Musical groups from Brighton and Hove